Charles, Prince of Viana (29 May 1421 – 23 September 1461), sometimes called Charles IV of Navarre, was the son of King John II of Aragon and Queen Blanche I of Navarre.

Background
His mother was the daughter and heiress of Charles III, King of Navarre. Both his grandfather Charles and his mother, who ruled over Navarre from 1425 to 1441, had bequeathed this kingdom to Charles, whose right had also been recognized by the Cortes; but when Blanche died in 1441 her husband John seized the kingdom to the exclusion of his son.

Marriage
The Prince of Viana was married in Olite (Navarre) on  30 September 1439, taking as his wife Agnes of Cleves (1422–1446), the daughter of Adolph I, Duke of Cleves and Mary of Burgundy; sister of Philip III "the Good", Duke of Burgundy. Agnes died, childless, on 6 April 1448, eight years after her marriage to Charles, aged only about twenty-six. After her death, the prince took a mistress, Brianda de Vaca, and by her had an illegitimate son, born about 1449. He wished to remarry, and a possibility which was canvassed was a match with Isabella of Scotland (1426–1494), the widow of Francis I, Duke of Brittany, after he died on 18 July 1450, but this was opposed by Charles VII of France. A match was then agreed between Charles and the Infanta Catherine of Portugal (1436–1463), daughter of King Edward I, but the marriage was delayed and had not taken place when Charles died in 1461. Charles left three illegitimate children by three different mistresses:

Anna, Countess of Medinaceli
Philip, Archbishop of Palermo
John, Bishop of Huesca

Clashes with his father 

The ill feeling between father and son was increased when in 1447 John took for his second wife Juana Enriquez, a Castilian noblewoman (of a bastard cadet line from Castilian kings), who soon bore him a son, afterwards Ferdinand II of Aragon, and who regarded her stepson as an interloper. When Joanna began to interfere in the internal affairs of Navarre, a civil war broke out, and in 1452 Charles, although aided by King John II of Castile, was defeated and taken prisoner. Released upon promising not to take the kingly title until after his father's death, the prince, again unsuccessful in an appeal to arms, took refuge in Naples with King Alfonso V of Aragon. In 1458 Alfonso died and John became king of Aragon, while Charles was offered the crowns of Naples and Sicily. He declined these proposals, and having been reconciled with his father returned to Navarre in 1459. Aspiring to marry Isabella of Castile, he was then thrown into prison by his father, and the Catalans rose in his favor. This insurrection soon became general and John was obliged to yield. He released his son, and recognized him as perpetual governor of Catalonia, and heir to the kingdom.

Death and legacy 

Soon afterwards, however, on 23 September 1461, the prince died at Barcelona, not without a suspicion that he had been poisoned by his stepmother, Joanna Enriquez.

Charles was a cultured and amiable prince, fond of music and literature. He translated Aristotle's Ethics into Aragonese, a work first published at Zaragoza in 1509, and wrote a chronicle of the kings of Navarre, Cronica de los reyes de Navarra.

Ancestry

References

External links
"El príncipe don Carlos de Viana" by José Moreno Carbonero at ArteHistoria
The Prince Carlos of Viana in Medieval History of Navarre

|-

|-

|-

|-

|-

1421 births
1461 deaths
15th-century Navarrese monarchs
Charles
Navarrese monarchs
Princes of Viana
Dukes of Montblanc
Dukes of Gandía
Navarrese infantes
Aragonese infantes
Heirs apparent who never acceded
Burials at the Poblet Monastery
Sons of kings